Riccobaldo of Ferrara (1246- after  1320) was a medieval Italian notary and Latin writer of the Middle Ages, a chronicler, geographer and encyclopedist. He is sometimes known in the literature as Riccobaldo da Ferrara according to the Italian form, or as Riccobaldo Ferrarese or as Riccolbaldo

Life 
He was born in Ferrara or in the surrounding area, most probably in 1246, his father being one  Bonmercato. On  4 October 1251, as a puer (boy), he was a witness to the passage through Ferrara of Pope Innocent IV; on  17 February 1264, as an adulescens (adolescent), he was present during the  funeral at Ferrara of Azzo VII d'Este; he appeared as a witness to a statute of Ferrara of 15 December 1274; in May 1282 he was to be found at Faenza; in 1290 he applied his seal to three documents at Reggio Emilia, where he served as notary to the vicar (deputy) of Obizzo II d'Este, the city’s podestà. He is known to have been at Padua in  1293, at  Ravenna in  1297-1300, exercising his  profession at  Ferrara in  1308, once again in Padua at unspecified period between 1308 and  1313, and at  Ferrara in  1310. He died some time after 1318.

The claims that his  real name was  Gervasio (Gervase), that he belonged to the Mainardi family, and that he was for a time  a canon in Ravenna, are doubtless products of somewhat approximate sixteenth- and seventeenth-century scholarship. One thing that is certain, because he himself says so, is that he bore the titles of dominus ("lord") and magister ("master"). Since Riccobaldo refers to himself as an exile, attempts have been made to see such an exile as a result of Riccobaldo's lending his support to Aldobrandino II in the latter’s clash with his brother Azzo VIII, Lord of  Ferrara. However, this hypothesis has to date found no evidence to back it up. That he had no love for the Este family can easily be seen in some of his works, but it is not discernible in others, and so important questions remain unclear. As remarked, Riccobaldo was notary to the vicar (deputy) of Obizzo II d'Este and in Ravenna he appears to have lived in the shadow of Obizzo Sanvitale, Archbishop of Ravenna, a known supporter of the Este family. Yet in 1308 Riccobaldo can be found in Ferrara, swearing fidelity to the Church of Rome immediately after the expulsion of the Este family from the lordship of the city. What should be made of these apparent contradictions.

Riccobaldo  witnessed, at times at very close quarters, the  political events in  his city,  and was sometimes a witness, too, of  what happened in the history of Italy as a whole, even in works of his that were not strictly historical, but more of a  geographical character.

Riccobaldo‘s  own  cultural story is in part fairly clearly established, even if considerable research is underway. Only recently has it been possible to attribute to him a political "carmen" (song)  in Latin which celebrates the newly acquired freedom of his city,   Ferrara. In this text there are obvious  citations of various earlier Latin  lyrics, a fact that shows a considerable personal culture for the period.  While the lyrics passed off in the seventeenth century as Riccobaldo‘s  by  Girolamo Baruffaldi are certainly not genuine, we still need once more to take into consideration the fact that he had the title of  magister ("master") and that phrase of his in his old age where  Riccobaldo says he is now  dedicated  melioribus studiis ("to the better kind of study" or "to  better pursuits").

Riccobaldo's Reading
By his own explicit admission, his first  impulse to write came from his  contact with the  archives firstly of  Nonantola and then of Ravenna. In Ravenna he came to know, as he himself recounts, the  Chronicon, that is to say the  Historia Ecclesiastica of  Eusebius of Caesarea, in the  Chronicon (Chronicle) of Saint Jerome, and in  all probability also the so-called Ravenna Cosmography; at  Nonantola he certainly had access to the  sequel to Jerome’s work, written this time by Saint Prosper of Aquitaine.

Among the numerous works he knew were the dictionary Elementarium doctrinae rudimentum of  Papias, the short  Chronicon of  Saint Isidore of Seville (attributed by Riccobaldo  to a bishop Miletus; then some decades of Livy’s   ‘’Ab Urbe Condita" (History of Rome);  the Historiae adversus paganos (Histories against the Pagans) of Paulus Orosius, the great  encyclopedic work by Marziano Capella entitled Itinerarium Antonini, Pliny the Elder’s  Naturalis historia (Natural History), the  Collectanea rerum memorabilium (Collection of Curiosities) of Solinus, the  work of compilation by  the Dominican Martin of Opava, which Riccobaldo cites as the  Martiniana,  parts  of the  Legenda aurea (Golden Legend) by Jacobus de Voragine, the  version of  Eutropius drawn up by  Paul the Deacon and the Historia Langobardorum (History of the Lombards), the abbreviated version of the Philippic Histories of Gnaeus Pompeius Trogus or Pompey Trogue composed  by  Justin, Florus, the  Pharsalia of Lucan, something of the writings of  Seneca the Younger (certainly including the  De consolatione ad Helviam and De clementia (On Clemency), Suetonius’s Vitae Caesarum (Lives of the Twelve Caesars), the Navigatio Sancti Brendani (The Sea Voyage of St Brendan), Servius’s   commentary on the Aeneid, works of Pomponius Mela, the Pseudo-Turpin Chronicle (Historia Caroli Magni, the Historia scholastica by Peter Comestor (a biblical paraphrase written in  Latin), Boethius's De consolatione philosophiae (The Consolation of Philosophy), Juvenal, the Latin translation by  Rufinus of Aquileia of Eusebius of Caesarea’s Historia Ecclesiastica, Agnellus of Ravenna.

After this  the list becomes very impressive as to  quantity and quality when we find  Riccobaldo at grips with Julius Caesar, at least the  problematic  De bello Alexandrino, along with De bello Africo and  De bello Hispaniensi (On the Alexandrine War, On the African War, On the Hispanic War);  Cicero’s  Laelius de amicitia (Laelius on Friendship’) and  Rhetorica ad Herennium (Rhetoric: For Herennius), and other works, too. We can add the  Distichs of Cato (Catonis Disticha), Einhard, Hegesippus, Horace, certain texts to be found in the so-called  Spicilegium Ravennatis historiae;  Virgil, perhaps the Dominican Vincent of Beauvais, and the manuscripts of the Abbey of Santa Giustina in  Padua, without excluding others still.

For this very considerable widening of his learning, Riccobaldo certainly owed a great deal to his mixing in the circles of the pre-humanists of Padua, from whom he learned much, but to whom he probably also gave not a little. In any case, there is no overlooking Riccobaldo nowadays as a figure of first rank in the history of Italian culture, despite his having been  neglected even in relatively recent times by historians who were otherwise not without merit.

Other works by  Riccobaldo, apart from those listed below, are his  geographical  compilations, one of which, the  De locis orbis, was published for the first time only in 1986, while the other,  De origine urbium Italie, had in 2013 still not been published. There are two minor treatises witnessed to by the manuscripts  Vatican City, Biblioteca Apostolica Vaticana, Ottob. Iat. 2072, cc. 45-58 e Parma, Biblioteca Palatina, Parm. 331, cc. 45-67 (for the first); and Venice, Biblioteca . Nazionale  Marciana, Lat. X, 169 (3847), cc. 2-31 (for the  second). While neither can be dated with any precision,  the first of these works if fully of his marure period, and the second from his last years.

Scholarly Editions of his Works 
 Riccobaldo da Ferrara, Chronica parva Ferrariensis, Introduzione, edizione e note di Gabriele Zanella, Ferrara 1983 (Deputazione provinciale ferrarese di storia patria, serie Monumenti, IX)
 Ricobaldi Ferrariensis, Compendium Romanae Historiae, cur. A.T. Hankey (FSI 108), Roma 1984
 Riccobaldo da Ferrara, De locis orbis, Introduzione, edizione e note di Gabriele Zanella, Ferrara 1986 (Deputazione provinciale ferrarese di storia patria, serie Monumenti, X), Libro I, Libro II
 Ricobaldi Ferrariensis, Compilatio chronologica, a cura di A. T. Hankey, Roma 2000 (Istituto storico italiano per il Medio Evo, R. I. S. 3, 4)

Further reading 
 Gabriele Zanella, Riccobaldo e dintorni. Studi di storiografia medievale ferrarese, Ferrara, Bovolenta 1980
 Gabriele Zanella, Il mondo e l'Italia nelle opere geografiche inedite di Riccobaldo da Ferrara: qualche paradigma di lettura, in "Imago mundi" La conoscenza scientifica nel pensiero bassomedioevale, Todi, Accademia tudertina 1983 (Convegni del Centro di studi sulla spiritualità medievale, XXII) pp. 157–81
 Gabriele Zanella, Cultura, scuola e storiografia a Ferrara tra XIII e XIV secolo in "Storia di Ferrara" 5 Il basso Medioevo XII-XIV Ferrara, Corbo 1987, pp. 241–64
 Gabriele Zanella, Equissimus tirannus, in "Annali della Facoltà di Lettere e Filosofia" dell'Università di Potenza 1987-89 [1990], pp. 187–97, vedi il testo
 schede di Gabriele Zanella relative a Ferrara in Repertorio della cronachistica emiliano-romagnola (secc. IX-XV) Roma, Istituto storico italiano per il Medio Evo 1991 (Nuovi studi storici 11), pp. 159–205 Schede
 Gabriele Zanella, Riccobaldo e Livio in "Studi Petrarcheschi" 6 (1989) [ma 1991], pp. 53–69, vedi il testo
 Gabriele Zanella, Note cronistiche del cremonese Gasapino Antegnati (sec. XIII-XIV) da un manoscritto del Pomerium Ravennatis Ecclesie di Riccobaldo da Ferrara Cremona, Turris 1991, Introduzione, testo
 Gabriele Zanella, Gli Estensi nella storiografia coeva (secoli XIII-XIV) in "Terra d'Este" 2,4 (1992) [1993], pp. 59–74, vedi il testo
 Gabriele Zanella, Note all'ed. Hankey del Compendium di Riccobaldo in Varietà d'harmonia et d'affetto. Studi in onore di Giovanni Marzi per il suo LXX compleanno Lucca, Libreria Musicale Italiana 1995 (Studi e testi musicali, n. s. 5),pp. 63–89
 Gabriele Zanella, Riccobaldo e Seneca, "Italia medioevale e umanistica" 36 (1993) [1997], pp. 249–64, e in Gli umanesimi medievali a c. di C. Leonardi, Firenze, SISMEL 1998, pp. 827–40, vedi il testo
 Gabriele Zanella, Federico II, Cremona, le cronache in Cremona città imperiale. Nell'VIII centenario della nascita di Federico II Atti del Convegno internazionale di studi Cremona 27-28 ottobre 1995, Cremona, Ed. Linograf 1999 (Annali della Biblioteca statale e libreria civica di Cremona 49),pp. 71–119, vedi il testo
 Gabriele Zanella, Note all'edizione Hankey della Compilatio chronologica di Riccobaldo in La norma e la memoria. Studi per Auugusto Vasina a c. di T. Lazzari, L. Mascanzoni, R. Rinaldi, Roma ISIME 2004 (Nuovi Studi Storici 67),pp. 213–67, vedi il testo
 Ann Teresa Hankey, Riccobaldo of Ferrara: his life, works and influence, Vol. 2 di Fonti per la storia dell'Italia medievale: Subsidia, Istituto storico italiano per il Medio Evo, 1996
 A.F. Massera, L’autenticità della Chronica parva Ferrariensis, in Archivio Muratoriano, volume I, fascicolo 10, 1911, pp. 549–565.
 A.F. Massera, Note per la biografia di Riccobaldo da Ferrara, in Archivio Muratoriano'', fascicoli 19-20, 1917, pp. 449–459.

References

1246 births
14th-century deaths
Year of death unknown
13th-century Latin writers
14th-century Latin writers
Italian Roman Catholic writers
Italian chroniclers
Italian notaries
14th-century Italian historians
13th-century Italian historians
Italian chronicles
13th-century Italian writers
14th-century Italian writers